The Beautiful Lie is the fourth album by British singer-songwriter Ed Harcourt, released in 2006. Ed's wife, Gita Harcourt, plays violin throughout the album and sings vocals on "Braille," and The Magic Numbers guest as backing vocalists on "Revolution in the Heart." Ed was dropped by Astralwerks Records/EMI in the US, the label which released his previous three albums. The album finally got a US release via Dovecote Records on 3 June 2008, nearly 2 years after its original release.

Track listing 
 "Whirlwind in D Minor" – 3:57
 "Visit from the Dead Dog" – 3:01
 "You Only Call Me When You're Drunk" – 4:27
 "The Last Cigarette" – 3:30
 "Shadowboxing" – 3:20
 "Late Night Partner" – 4:36
 "Revolution in the Heart" – 4:20
 "Until Tomorrow Then" – 3:56
 "Scatterbraine" – 2:46
 "Rain on the Pretty Ones" – 4:18
 "The Pristine Claw" – 3:19
 "I Am the Drug" – 3:31
 "Braille" – 5:31
 "Good Friends Are Hard to Find" – 3:52

UK iTunes-only bonus track
  "Little Miss Secretive" – 3:24

Singles 
 "Visit from the Dead Dog" (29 May 2006)
 CD b/w: "The Distance Between"
 7" vinyl No. 1 b/w: "Minotaur"
 Amber-coloured 7" vinyl No. 2 b/w: "Blondes, Brunettes and Redheads"
 "Revolution in the Heart" (23 October 2006)
 Digital download only. B-side: "Surreal Killer"
 "Until Tomorrow Then" (19 August 2008)
 Music video single only.

Personnel 
 "Whirlwind in D Minor"
 Ed Harcourt – Piano, Spanish guitar, electric guitar, bass, music box, vocals
 B.J. Cole – Pedal steel
 Dimitri Tikovoi – Drums
 "Visit from the Dead Dog"
 Ed Harcourt – Piano, bass, synth strings, Hammond organ, vocals
 Graham Coxon – Guitar
 Jari Haapalainen – Drums
 Hadrian Garrard – Trumpet
 Leo Abrahams – Guitar
 "You Only Call Me When You're Drunk"
 Ed Harcourt – Piano, bass, bells, vocals
 Jari Haapalainen – Drums
 Hadrian Garrard – Trumpet
 Leo Abrahams – Guitar
 Fiona Brice – String arrangement
 Violin – Gillon Cameron, Sally Jackson, Ellie Stanford, Gita Harcourt, Jess Murphy, Rosie Langley
 Viola – Amy Stanford, Louise Hogan
 Cello – Laura Anstee, Jonny Byers
 "The Last Cigarette"
 Ed Harcourt – Guitar, vocals
 Gita Harcourt – Violin
 "Shadowboxing"
 Ed Harcourt – Guitar, bass, organ, vocals
 Jari Haapalainen – Drums, shaker
 "Late Night Partner"
 Ed Harcourt – Piano, vocals
 Johan Berthling – String arrangement
 Violin – Lars Warnstad, George Kentros, Anna Rodell, Lisa Rydell
 Cello – Anna Wallgren, Leo Svensson
 "Revolution in the Heart"
 Ed Harcourt – Piano, bass, casiotone, SK1, vocals
 Jeremy Stacey – Drums
 Jari Haapalainen – Drums
 Michele Stodart – Backing vocals
 Romeo Stodart – Backing vocals
 Sean Gannon – Backing vocals
 Angela Gannon – Backing vocals
 Leo Abrahams – Guitars
 "Until Tomorrow Then"
 Ed Harcourt – Optigan, piano, vocals
 Jari Haapalainen – Drums
 Gita Harcourt – Backing vocals
 Hadrian Garrard – Trumpet
 "Scatterbraine"
 Ed Harcourt – Piano, bass, organ, vocals
 Jari Haapalainen – Drums
 Johan Berthling – String arrangement
 Violin – Lars Warnstad, George Kentros, Anna Rodell, Lisa Rydell
 Cello – Anna Wallgren, Leo Svensson
 "Rain on the Pretty Ones"
 Ed Harcourt – Piano, vocals
 Leo Abrahams – Guitar
 Ellekari Larsson – Backing Vocals
 Ane Brun – Backing Vocals
 Jenny Wilson – Backing Vocals
 Nina Kinert – Backing Vocals
 Anja Bigrell – Backing Vocals
 Amy Langley – String arrangement
 Gita Harcourt – String arrangement
 Violin – Gillon Cameron, Sally Jackson, Ellie Stanford, Gita Harcourt, Jess Murphy, Rosie Langley
 Viola – Amy Stanford, Louise Hogan
 Cello – Laura Anstee, Jonny Byers
 "The Pristine Claw"
 Ed Harcourt – Guitar, vocals
 Leo Abrahams – Guitar
 Johan Berthling – Woodwind arrangement
 Thomas Bodin – Oboe
 "I Am the Drug"
 Ed Harcourt – Piano, bass, vocals
 Jari Haapalainen – Drums
 Leo Abrahams – Guitars
 Fiona Brice – String arrangement
 Violin – Gillon Cameron, Sally Jackson, Ellie Stanford, Gita Harcourt, Jess Murphy, Rosie Langley
 Viola – Amy Stanford, Louise Hogan
 Cello – Laura Anstee, Jonny Byers
 "Braille"
 Ed Harcourt – Guitar, piano, vocals
 Gita Harcourt – Vocals
 Leo Abrahams – Baritone guitar, guitar treatments
 Jari Haapalainen – Percussion
 "Good Friends Are Hard to Find"
 Ed Harcourt – Piano, vocals
 Hadrian Garrard – Trumpet
 Leo Abrahams – String arrangement
 Violin – Gillon Cameron, Sally Jackson, Ellie Stanford, Gita Harcourt, Jess Murphy, Rosie Langley
 Viola – Amy Stanford, Louise Hogan
 Cello – Laura Anstee, Jonny Byers

References 

2006 albums
Ed Harcourt albums
Heavenly Recordings albums
Dovecote Records albums